Paul Porter (born c. 1954) is an American public address announcer.

Paul Porter may also refer to:

Paul A. Porter (1904–1975), American lawyer and chairman of the Federal Communications Commission
Paul Porter (musician) (born 1962), American gospel musician
Paul Porter (Michigan politician) (1907–2002), American politician
Steven Porter (Canadian politician) (Paul Steven Porter, born 1945), member of the Legislative Assembly of New Brunswick